Tamara Taggart  (born May 2, 1968) is a former Canadian television presenter. She served as the weekday anchor of CTV News at Six alongside Mike Killeen on CIVT-TV ("CTV British Columbia") in Vancouver between 2010 and 2018.

Biography 

Taggart's career in broadcasting started while she was attending BCIT in Burnaby, British Columbia, where she was enrolled in the Broadcast Communications program. She graduated in 1991. Her class included Vancouver sports broadcaster John Shorthouse, NewCap Radio GM Steve Parsons, McVay Media writer and program director Paul Durante, swing-shift DJ John Woodlock and former long-time Cariboo broadcast personality Dalton Hooker. Her early work was in radio and concert promotion. However, in 1997, she landed a recurring role on community calendar spots on CIVT-DT (then known as "Vancouver Television"). From there, she moved on to co-host the breakfast show and then, later, the entertainment spot on the evening news.

In 2001, Taggart moved over to the weather desk where she stayed for nine years. During the station's 5 pm, 6pm and 11:30 pm newscasts she presented the forecast from CTV's studios as well as various (and numerous) locations around Vancouver, the Lower Mainland and on Vancouver Island. In January 2011, Taggart transferred to the CTV news desk.

Taggart also hosted a home renovation show, Love It or Lose It, for two seasons, on the Home and Garden TV channel (HGTV).

Taggart had minor roles in the films Antitrust, Josie and the Pussycats, Halloween: Resurrection and Along Came a Spider, and on several television series, including Robson Arms, Cold Squad, and Touching Evil.

The Georgia Straight Annual Reader's Poll named Taggart as Vancouver's "Best TV Weather Person" and "Best TV Personality" in 2002, 2003 and 2004. She was named "Woman of the Year" at the Consumer's Choice Awards in 2003 and has appeared on the cover of TV Week Magazine seven times. In 2005, Taggart was nominated for a Leo Award for "Best Host, Lifestyles Series" for Love It or Lose It. Taggart has also been featured in Hello Canada in July 2009 and August 2009.

Taggart was married on February 4, 2006, to Juno award-winning guitarist and record producer Dave Genn with Senator Larry Campbell, former mayor of Vancouver, serving as the officiant at the marriage ceremony. Taggart and Genn have a son and two daughters.

Taggart co-hosted Live! with Regis and Kelly for one day on Friday August 21, 2009.

On December 8, 2010, it was announced that Taggart would co-anchor the CTV News at Six alongside Mike Killeen, effective January 3, 2011, following the stepping-down of longtime anchors Pamela Martin and Bill Good. In 2018, Taggart and Killeen were fired from CTV due to restructuring.

On December 11, 2018, Taggart announced that she was seeking the Liberal nomination for Vancouver Kingsway in the 2019 federal election. She secured the nomination, but lost the election to the incumbent, Don Davies.

Currently, Tamara is the host for the Telus Talks with Tamara Taggart podcast series. She partnered with Telus in March 2020 to launch the weekly podcast, where she interviews doctors, healthcare professionals and prominent Canadians.

Electoral record

References

External links 

 Official website
 
 TELUS Talks with Tamara Taggart

Canadian television meteorologists
Living people
Journalists from British Columbia
1968 births
Canadian television news anchors
British Columbia Institute of Technology alumni
Canadian women television journalists
People from Vancouver
CTV Television Network people
Liberal Party of Canada candidates for the Canadian House of Commons
Members of the Order of British Columbia